Luzhanka may refer to:

Luzhanka (border checkpoint), Zakarpattia Oblast
Luzhanka (village), Odessa Oblast